Óscar González Garrido  (born 8 August 1976 in Antequera, Málaga) is decathlete from Spain.

Achievements

References
 

1976 births
Living people
Spanish decathletes
Athletes (track and field) at the 2005 Mediterranean Games
Mediterranean Games competitors for Spain